is a railway station on the Seibu Shinjuku Line in Nakano, Tokyo, Japan, operated by the private railway operator Seibu Railway.

Lines

During the daytime off-peak, the station is served by six trains per hour in either direction.

Station layout

The station consists of a two ground-level side platforms serving two tracks.

Platforms

History 
The station opened on 16 April 1927.

Station numbering was introduced on all Seibu Railway lines during fiscal 2012, with Araiyakushi-mae Station becoming "SS05".

Future developments
In order to ease congestion and improve the safety of the railway in the local area, plans have been produced to divert the tracks between Nakai Station and Nogata Station underground. Consequently, the existing station complex is expected to be replaced by an underground station. Approval for the plan was granted in April 2013.

Passenger statistics
In fiscal 2013, the station was the 48th busiest on the Seibu network with an average of 22,645 passengers daily.

The passenger figures for previous years are as shown below.

Surrounding area
 , commonly known as Araiyakushi, after which the station was named
 Mejiro University Shinjuku campus

References

External links

 Araiyakushi-mae Station 

Railway stations in Tokyo
Nakano, Tokyo
Railway stations in Japan opened in 1927